Dolomedes elegans Taczanowski, 1874 is a spider species in the family Pisauridae, found in French Guiana. 

(Note, Another species described two years after the original, initially namedDolomedes elegans L. Koch, 1876, and later named Nilus kochi is now considered as Mangromedes kochi, and is found in Queensland, Australia.)

See also 
 List of Pisauridae species

References

External links 

elegans
Spiders described in 1874
Spiders of South America
Arthropods of South America
Fauna of French Guiana